= Listed buildings in Læsø Municipality =

This list of listed buildings in Læsø Municipality is a list of listed buildings in Læsø Municipality, Denmark.

== The list ==
Listing name	Image	Location	Year built	Contributing resource	Ref
Alleen 1, Andrines Hus		Alleen 1, 9940 Læsø	c. 1780	Seaweed-thatched house from c. 1780	[Alleen 1, 9940 Læsø Ref4]
Alléen 3		Alleen 3, 9940 Læsø	1879	Seaweed-thatched house from 1768	Ref
Alléen 5		Alleen 5, 9940 Læsø	c. 1880	Seaweed-thatched house from c. 1880	Ref
Danzigmannvej 2		Danzigmannvej 2, 9940 Læsø	c. 1750	Seaweed-thatched house from c. 175+	Ref
Lille Stoklundvej 3		Lille Stoklundvej 3, 9940 Læsø	Pre-1680	Seaweed-thatched house from before 1680 with a few younger additions	Ref
Lille Stoklundvej 25		Stoklundvejen 25, 9940 Læsø	c. 1750	Seaweed-thatched house from c. 1750	Ref
Lille Strandgårdsvej 1 (3)		Lille Strandgårdsvej 1, 9940 Læsø	c. 1750	Three-winged farmhouse from c. 1750 and earlier	Ref
Mosevej 16		Mosevej 16, 9940 Læsø	1830	Seaweed-thatched house from 1830	Ref
Museumsgården		Museumsvej 3, 9940 Læsø	18th century	Four-winged farmhouse from the second half of the 18th century	Ref
Nattergalevej 15		Nattergalevej 15, 9940 Læsø	c. 1700	L-shaped, half-timbered house with straw and seaweed-thatched roof from c. 1700	Ref
Tangborgvej 4		Tangborgvej 4, 9940 Læsø	1830	Seaweed-thatched house from c. 1865	Ref
